The Emporia Micropolitan Statistical Area, as defined by the United States Census Bureau, is an area consisting of two counties in Kansas, anchored by the city of Emporia.

As of the 2000 census, the μSA had a population of 38,965 (though a July 1, 2009 estimate placed the population at 36,399).

Counties
Chase
Lyon

Communities
Places with more than 20,000 inhabitants
Emporia (Principal city)
Places with 500 to 1,000 inhabitants
Americus
Cottonwood Falls
Hartford 
Olpe 
Strong City
Places with fewer than 500 inhabitants
Admire
Allen
Neosho Rapids
Bushong
Reading
Cedar Point
Elmdale
Matfield Green
Unincorporated places
Bazaar

Demographics
As of the census of 2000, there were 38,965 people, 14,937 households, and 9,456 families residing within the μSA. The racial makeup of the μSA was 84.33% White, 2.17% African American, 0.47% Native American, 1.89% Asian, 0.01% Pacific Islander, 9.07% from other races, and 2.05% from two or more races. Hispanic or Latino of any race were 15.56% of the population.

The median income for a household in the μSA was $32,738, and the median income for a family was $41,480. Males had a median income of $28,134 versus $21,433 for females. The per capita income for the μSA was $16,573.

See also
Kansas census statistical areas

References

 
Lyon County, Kansas
Chase County, Kansas